Neo-Catholicism may refer to: 
An intellectual movement in French Catholicism in the wake of the French revolution (early 19th century), see Frédéric Ozanam
Mainstream Catholicism after Vatican I (1870) from the point of view of the Old Catholic Church 
 Mainstream Catholicism after the 2nd Vatican Council as well as anyone that attends a parish affiliated with it from the perspective of Traditionalist Catholics
Neocatólicos, a counter-revolutionary political tradition, faction or movement in late 19th-century Spain

See also
Neo-ultramontanism
Neo-scholasticism (Neo-Thomism)
Neo-Christian (Swedenborgianism)